This is a list of commonly cultivated varieties of sweet corn, and the approximate number of days from germination of corn plant to harvest.  Unless otherwise noted with the term open pollinated, all varieties are hybrids.

Genetically modified varieties only available to large-scale commercial growers, such as Bt corn and glyphosate resistant corn, are not listed.

Standard (su)
The oldest type of sweet corn contains more sugar and less starch than field corn intended for livestock.  Tends to be heartier in respect to planting depth, germination and growth than other types.  Begins conversion of sugar to starch after peak maturity or harvest, and as such is best eaten immediately after harvest.

Yellow su

 Early Sunglow, 62 days
 Sundance, 69 days
 Early Golden Bantam, 80 days (heirloom, open pollinated.  Introduced in 1902, this became the first widely grown yellow variety.  The original strain is now often called 'Golden Bantam 8 Row' to indicate it has 8 rows of kernels on the ear.  A number of "improved" strains exist with 12 or more rows of kernels on the ear)
 Iochief, 80 days (1951 AAS winner)
 True Gold, 80+ days (open pollinated selection from Golden Jubilee Hybrid) 
 Golden Cross Bantam, 85 days (Introduced in 1933, this became the first widely grown hybrid sweet corn for both home gardens and commercial growers)

White su
 True Platinum, 80 days (open pollinated)
 Martian Jewels, 80+ days (open pollinated, unusual purple stalks and cobs)
 Luther Hill, 82 days (heirloom, open pollinated)
 Country Gentleman, 92 days (heirloom, shoepeg type, open pollinated)
 Silver Queen, 92 days
 Stowell's Evergreen, 98 days (heirloom, open pollinated.  In northern climates or higher altitudes, this variety may not reach full maturity in the growing season.  However, before the killing frost entire stalks may be harvested, including the partially mature ears, and hung in a barn or shed. Ears may then be picked for a month or more, hence the name evergreen.)

Bicolor su
 Double Standard, 73 days (open pollinated)
 Butter & Sugar, 75 days
 Honey & Cream, 84 days

Multicolor su
Multicolored varieties are usually at their sweetest when the mature color just starts to "blush" on the kernels.
 Hookers, 70 days (open pollinated, white turning blue at maturity)
 Triple Play, 70 days (open pollinated, white-yellow bicolor turning partially blue at maturity)
 Painted Hill, 75 days (open pollinated, mostly white turning various pastels at maturity)
 Wild Violet, 75 days (purple-white bicolor)
 Black Mexican/Aztec, 76 days (heirloom, open pollinated, white turning blue-black at maturity)
 Double Red, 80+ days (open pollinated, white turning dark red at maturity)

Sugary Extender (se)
Contains even more sugars in relation to starch than su types, and as such is able to retain sweetness for 2 to 4 days with proper refrigerated handling.  Somewhat less hardy than su types, it is known as a "tender" kernel and as such does not lend itself to mechanical handling.  Does not require isolation from su pollen, although it is preferred.  Some seed catalogs don't distinguish the heterozygous se (one se parent) and homozygous se (two se parent) varieties, but if they do, the homozygous se varieties will be labeled either se+, (se se) or SE.

Yellow se

 Buttergold, 63 days
 Spring Treat, 67 days
 Sugar Buns, 72 days
 Kandy King, 73 days
 Bodacious R/M, 75 days
 Incredible, 83 days
 Miracle, 84 days
 Kandy Korn EH, 89 days

White se
 Spring Snow, 65 days
 Sugar Pearl, 73 days
 Whiteout, 73 days
 Cloud Nine, 77 days
 Silver King, 82 days (se version of Silver Queen)
 Argent, 86 days

Bicolor se

 Silver N Gold, 65 days
 Sugar Baby, 65 days
 Bon Jour, 70 days
 Trinity, 70 days
 Bi-Licious, 72 days
 Temptation, 72 days
 Luscious, 73 days
 Ambrosia, 75 days 
 Who Gets Kissed?, 78+ days (open pollinated)
 Precious Gem, 80 days
 Peaches and Cream Mid EH, 83 days
 Delectable R/M, 84 days

Supersweet (sh2)
Supersweet or shrunken-2 types have four to ten times the sugar content of normal sugar (su) types and with proper handling is able to be stored for up to 10 days.  Less hardy than even se types, requiring higher germination temperatures, precise planting depth and isolation from all other corn pollen for optimum results.  The name derives from the shrunken, shriveled appearance of the dried kernel which is low in starch.

Yellow sh2
 Extra Early Super Sweet, 67 days
 Takeoff, 69 days
 Early Xtra Sweet, 70 days (1971 AAS winner)
 Summer Sweet Yellow, 74 days
 Krispy King, 78 days
 Challenger, 80 days
 Passion, 81 days
 Excel, 82 days
 Jubilee SuperSweet, 83 days
 Illini Xtra Sweet, 85 days
 Crisp ‘N Sweet, 85 days

White sh2
 Summer Sweet White, 73 days
 Treasure, 83 days
 How Sweet It Is, 85 days (1986 AAS winner)
 Camelot, 86 days

Bicolor sh2
 Summer Sweet Bicolor, 73 days
 Honey ‘N Pearl, 78 days (1988 AAS winner)
 Aloha, 82 days
 Dazzle, 82 days
 Hudson, 83 days
 Phenomenal, 85 days

Synergistic (sy)
Synergistic varieties combine differing genetics on the same ear.  The first varieties developed of this type have 25% sh2, 25% se and 50% su kernels on the cob but now different combinations are possible.  There is an increasing number of brand names and trademarks that cover specific genetic combinations under this general type.  However, a common trait of all sy types is that isolation from other su and se varieties pollinating at the same time is not required, though isolation may still be recommended for maximum sweetness.

Yellow sy
 Applause, 72 days
 Inferno, 73 days
 Honey Select, 79 days (2001 AAS winner)

White sy
 Illusion, 72 days
 Mattapoisett, 80 days
 Avalon, 82 days (White version of Providence)

Bicolor sy
 Sweetness, 68 days
 Pay Dirt, 70 days
 Revelation, 70 days
 Renaissance, 73 days
 Charisma, 74 days
 Synergy, 76 days
 Montauk, 80 days (Delectable type)
 Kristine, 80 days (Cinderella type)
 Serendipity/Providence, 82 days
 Cameo, 84 days (Delectable type)

Augmented Supersweet
Varieties of the augmented supersweet type combine multiple gene types on top of sh2.  These varieties have 100% of the kernels containing the sh2 gene, but also have se and su genes in some portion of the kernels.  

The augmented supersweet varieties have tender kernels like the se varieties.  Therefore, mechanical picking is not recommended.

As with other supersweets, these varieties must be isolated from su, se and sy types pollinating at the same time to prevent starchy kernels.

Yellow
 Vision, 75 days

White
 Xtra-Tender 3473, 73 days
 Devotion, 82 days

Bicolor
 Kickoff XR, 69 days
 Anthem XR, 73 days
 Xtra-Tender 2573, 73 days 
 Xtra-Tender 274A, 74 days
 Fantastic XR, 75 days
 Triumph, 75 days
 American Dream, 77 days (2018 AAS winner)
 Obsession, 79 days
 Xtra-Tender 282A, 82 days

See also
 International Code of Nomenclature for Cultivated Plants

References

External links
 corn varieties and tips on growing corn
 Purdue Ag Center corn varieties
 Growing Sweet Corn in Missouri
 Maize Genetics and Genomics Database

Lists of cultivars